Platydoras is a small genus of thorny catfishes native to freshwater habitats in subtropical and tropical South America.

Species
There are currently five recognized species in this genus:

 Platydoras armatulus (Valenciennes, 1840) (Southern striped raphael)
 Platydoras brachylecis Piorski, Garavello, Arce H. & Sabaj Pérez, 2008
 Platydoras birindellii Sousa et al., 2018
 Platydoras costatus (Linnaeus, 1758) (Raphael catfish)
 Platydoras hancockii (Valenciennes, 1840)

References

Doradidae
Fish of South America
Catfish genera
Taxa named by Pieter Bleeker
Freshwater fish genera